Neptune was a  merchant ship built at Chepstow, Wales in 1836. She made one voyage transporting convicts from Ireland to Australia.

Career
Neptune first appeared in Lloyd's Register (LR) in 1836.

Her first voyage, in early 1837, was to Barbados. She was under the command of J. Nagle, and she arrived back in May.

On her only convict voyage, under the command of Joseph (or Jeremiah) Nagle and surgeon Patrick Martyn, she departed Dublin, Ireland on 27 August 1837, and arrived in Sydney on 2 January 1838. She had embarked 200 male convicts; there were three convict deaths en route. From Sydney she sailed to New Zealand, and then to Callao and Valparaiso. She arrived back at Liverpool on 21 May 1839. Her cargo consisted on 4_7 tons of copper ore, 725 bales of cotton, 79 tons of Nicaragua wood, 19 bales of wool, 132 pieces of copper, and eight seal skins. 

She is last listed in 1845.

Citations and references
Citations

References
 
 

1836 ships
Ships built in Wales
Convict ships to New South Wales
Age of Sail merchant ships